The Son of Hannibal is a 1918 German silent film directed by and starring Viggo Larsen. It also features Franz Verdier and Käthe Haack. The film was remade in 1926.

References

Bibliography
 Bock, Hans-Michael & Bergfelder, Tim. The Concise CineGraph. Encyclopedia of German Cinema. Berghahn Books, 2009.

External links

1918 films
Films of the German Empire
German silent feature films
Films directed by Viggo Larsen
Films based on German novels
German horse racing films
German black-and-white films
UFA GmbH films
1910s German films
1910s German-language films